The Buta Palace is one of the principal performing arts centers and music venues of Baku.

Facilities
It consists of two event halls and adjacent parking lot for 800 cars. The greater hall is a caravanserai-stylized venue, capable of accommodating about 2,000 visitors. The minor hall is designed for conferences and presentations and can house 400 visitors.

Events

The Buta Palace hosted a number of sizeable events, including the semifinal allocation-draw of the Eurovision Song Contest 2012. It has also hosted performances of various artists (David Vendetta, Pitbull, 50 Cent, G-Unit, Akon, Chris Willis, and others).

References

External links

Buildings and structures in Baku
Music venues in Azerbaijan
Tourist attractions in Baku
2006 establishments in Azerbaijan